Matthias Florian Lechner (born February 27, 1970) is a motion picture production designer and art director. He worked as an art director and designer on the animated films Zootopia, Help! I'm a Fish and Escape from Planet Earth, as well as Laura's Star, among other films. He was born in Mannheim, Germany, and lives in Ventura, California.

Filmography

Art director
Ralph Breaks the Internet
Zootopia
Escape from Planet Earth
Space Chimps
Werner - gekotzt wird später
Help! I'm a Fish

Set designer/Workbook
No-Eared Bunny and Two-Eared Chick
Laura's Star and the Dream Monsters
Laura's Star in China
Kleiner Dodo
The little Polarbear 2
Laura's Star
Globi and the Stolen Shadows
Troll Story
Karlsson on the Roof - TV

Pippi Longstocking

Co-Director
Junior TV

Layout-Supervisor
Quest for Camelot

Ottifants TV'''

Layout-ArtistJungledyret Hugo 2FelidaeBackground-PainterDer kleene Punker''

References

External links

 Matthias Lechner Official Site
 Lines and colors - blog

1970 births
German production designers
German art directors
Living people
Mass media people from Mannheim
German emigrants to the United States